The Good Citizen was a sixteen-page monthly political periodical edited by Bishop Alma White and illustrated by Reverend Branford Clarke. The Good Citizen was published from 1913 until 1933 by the Pillar of Fire Church at their headquarters in Zarephath, New Jersey in the United States. White used the publication to expose "political Romanism in its efforts to gain the ascendancy in the U.S."

In 1915, the publication's anti-Catholic rhetoric aroused the local population in Plainfield, New Jersey and a mob formed to threaten the Pillar of Fire Church. By 1921, the publication was a strong supporter of the Ku Klux Klan.

Content
The Good Citizen espoused the political views of Alma White and consisted of essays, speeches and cartoons promoting women's equality, anti-Catholicism, antisemitism, nativism, white supremacy and the Ku Klux Klan. The tract also contained numerous topically provocative illustrations by Reverend Branford Clarke.

Ku Klux Klan and anti-Catholicism
According to Wyn Craig Wade in his 1998 book The Fiery Cross:

[Alma White] was also probably the most active and prolific fundamentalist minister in the 1920s. ... Her value to the Klan, however, came from her viciously anti-Catholic magazine, The Good Citizen, and her easily readable theological tracts that simultaneously found scriptural support for the Invisible Empire [the KKK] and excoriation for the Catholic Church. ... Her books abounded with conspiracy themes: "We hail the K.K.K. in the great movement that is now on foot ... Were it not that the press is throttled by Rome and her Hebrew allies, astounding revelations would be made, showing the public the necessity for the rising of the Heroes of the Fiery Cross."

White supremacy and racism against African Americans
The following is from the text of a speech given by Alma White on December 31, 1922 at the Pillar of Fire Church at 123 Sterling Place, Brooklyn, New York and published in the February, 1923 (Vol. 11 No. 2) edition of The Good Citizen.  The speech is titled "Ku Klux Klan and Woman's Causes" and the section of the speech which is reprinted below is titled "White Supremacy."

Books from The Good Citizen
White published three books that were compendiums of the essays, speeches and cartoons from it entitled The Ku Klux Klan in Prophecy (1925), Klansmen: Guardians of Liberty (1926), and Heroes of the Fiery Cross (1928).  In 1943 White reprinted her Klan books as a three volume set under the title Guardians of Liberty.

In 1929, Ray Bridwell White, White's son and president of Zarephath Bible Institute published The Truth in Satire Concerning Infallible Popes which also was a compendium of his essays that had originally been published in The Good Citizen.

Backlash
In 1918, 500 members of the New York City Roman Catholic parish of Our Lady of Lourdes called on the United States Postmaster General to exclude The Good Citizen from the US mail.

Existing copies
Copies of The Good Citizen are available in six US libraries:
Brigham Young University Library  (extensive collection)
Denver Public Library
University of Texas Libraries - Austin
Duke University Library
Syracuse University
New York Public Library (extensive collection)

References

External links
Images published in The Good Citizen on Flickr

Further reading

1913 establishments in New Jersey
1933 disestablishments in New Jersey
Conservative magazines published in the United States
Monthly magazines published in the United States
Christian fundamentalism
Defunct political magazines published in the United States
Discrimination in the United States
Ku Klux Klan publications
Magazines established in 1913
Magazines disestablished in 1933
Magazines published in New Jersey
Pillar of Fire International
Plainfield, New Jersey
White supremacy in the United States
Anti-Catholic publications